Pseudaphaenops is a genus of beetles in the family Carabidae, containing the following species:

 Pseudaphaenops jocobsoni Pliginskiy, 1912
 Pseudaphaenops tauricus Winkler, 1912

References

Trechinae